Trémilly is a commune in the Haute-Marne department in north-eastern France.

The two villages of Nully and Trémilly were merged from 1 December 1972 to 1 January 2005. They are now two separate communes.

See also
Communes of the Haute-Marne department
Nully-Trémilly

References

Communes of Haute-Marne